Ramón Folch Frigola (born 4 October 1989) is a Spanish professional footballer who plays for CE Sabadell as a central midfielder.

Club career
Born in Reus, Tarragona, Catalonia, Folch made his senior debut with local CA Roda de Barà in the Primera Catalana. In the 2008 summer he signed for fellow league team FC Vilafranca, and represented FC Cambrils the following campaign.

In July 2010, Folch joined Tercera División side CF Amposta. After being a regular starter, he moved to UB Conquense in July 2012, and achieved promotion to Segunda División B at the end of the season.

On 11 July 2013, Folch agreed to a contract with CF Reus Deportiu, a club he already represented as a youth. He renewed his contract on 14 June of the following year, and contributed with 38 appearances during the 2015–16 campaign as his side was promoted to Segunda División for the first time ever.

Folch made his professional debut on 20 August, starting in a 1–0 away win against RCD Mallorca. He scored his first professional goal on 25 September, netting the first in a 1–1 home draw against Rayo Vallecano.

On 26 November 2016, Folch scored a brace in a 2–2 draw at Real Zaragoza. The following 30 June, he signed a two-year contract with fellow second tier club Real Oviedo.

On 1 July 2019, Folch agreed to a deal with Elche CF also in the second division. He contributed with one goal in 36 appearances (play-offs included) in his first season, as his side achieved promotion to La Liga.

Folch made his top tier debut at the age of 30 on 30 September 2020, replacing Raúl Guti late into a 1–0 away win against SD Eibar. Six days later, however, he was loaned to second division side CD Tenerife for the 2020–21 campaign.

References

External links

1989 births
Living people
People from Reus
Sportspeople from the Province of Tarragona
Spanish footballers
Footballers from Catalonia
Association football midfielders
Segunda División players
Segunda División B players
Tercera División players
Primera Catalana players
CF Reus Deportiu B players
UB Conquense footballers
CF Reus Deportiu players
Real Oviedo players
Elche CF players
CD Tenerife players